Kampong Serambangun (Malay for Serambangun Village) is a village in Tutong District, Brunei, within the mukim of Pekan Tutong. The postcode for Kampong Serambangun is TA2541.

References 

Serambangun